Rhopalovalva pulchra is a species of moth of the family Tortricidae. It is found in China (Zhejiang, Fujian), Korea, Japan and the Russian Far East.

The wingspan is 11–15 mm.

The larvae feed on Quercus species and Fraxinus mandshurica var. japonica.

References

Moths described in 1879
Eucosmini